A parliamentary election was held in Estonia on 6 March 2011, with e-voting between 24 February and 2 March 2011. The newly elected 101 members of the 12th Riigikogu assembled at Toompea Castle in Tallinn within ten days of the election.

The 101 members of the Riigikogu (Parliament of Estonia) were elected using a form of proportional representation for a four-year term. The seats were allocated using a modified D'Hondt method. The country is divided into twelve multi-mandate electoral districts. There is a nationwide threshold of 5% for party lists, but if the number of votes cast for a candidate exceeds or equals the simple quota (which shall be obtained by dividing the number of valid votes cast in the electoral district by the number of mandates in the district) the candidate is elected.

Pre-election polls put the Reform Party, led by Prime Minister Andrus Ansip, ahead of its main rival, the opposition Centre Party. The former is right of centre, the latter is considered populist, slightly to the left on economic matters. Both parties are members of the European Liberal Democrat and Reform Party.

The election was marked by the highest number of running independents (32) since 1992. Several independent candidates were members of the Estonian Patriotic Movement.

Seats by electoral district

Opinion polls

Conduct
The Office for Democratic Institutions and Human Rights of the Organization for Security and Co-operation in Europe observed this election and issued a report with a number of recommendations.

Results

References

External links
Estonian National Electoral Committee
Poll ratings of political parties
NSD: European Election Database - Estonia publishes regional level election data; allows for comparisons of election results, 1990-2011

Parliamentary elections in Estonia
Estonia
Parliamentary